Blake & Rice is an album by American guitarists Norman Blake and Tony Rice, released in 1987. They later teamed up again for Norman Blake and Tony Rice 2.

Reception

In his AllMusic review, critic Jim Smith wrote of the album "There is some exceptional flatpicking here, but even the more manic passages are tempered by a softness that is striking, and perhaps even a little disappointing, in its modesty. Once the listener gets past the desire to hear hardcore chops, though, the album reveals its full beauty..."

Track listing 
 "New Chance Blues" (Norman Blake) – 2:15
 "Greenlight on the Southern" (Blake) – 3:43
 "I'm Not Sayin'" (Gordon Lightfoot) – 2:16
 "Texas Gales" (Traditional) – 3:38
 "Ridge Road Gravel" (Blake) – 2:25
 "Monroe's Hornpipe" (Bill Monroe) – 2:14
 "Last Train From Poor Valley" (Blake) – 3:32
 "New River Train" (Monroe) – 3:25
 "Stoney Point" (Traditional) – 2:11
 "Gonna Lay Down My Old Guitar" (Alton Delmore, Rabon Delmore) – 3:32
 "Little Beggarman/Gilderoy" (Traditional) – 3:05
 "The Shipyard Apprentice" (Norman Buchan, R. Campbell, Archie Fisher) – 4:13
 "Medley: Fiddler's Dream/Whiskey Before Breakfast" (Traditional) – 4:40
 "I'm Coming Back (But I Don't Know When)" (Traditional) – 2:43

Personnel
Norman Blake – guitar, mandolin, vocals
Tony Rice – guitar, vocals
Production notes
George Horn – mastering
Bill Wolf – engineer, photography

References

1987 albums
Norman Blake (American musician) albums
Tony Rice albums
Rounder Records albums